Vola Ridge (‘Rid Vola’ \'rid 'vo-la\) is the mostly ice-covered triple-peaked ridge extending 2.6 km in south-southeast to north-northwest direction and 1.1 km wide, with a central height rising to 879 m and southern one of 933 m on the southeast side of Sofia University Mountains in northern Alexander Island, Antarctica. It surmounts Poste Valley to the northwest and Nichols Snowfield to the southeast.  The ridge was visited on 2 February 1988 by the geological survey team of Christo Pimpirev and Borislav Kamenov (First Bulgarian Antarctic Expedition), and Philip Nell and Peter Marquis (British Antarctic Survey).

The feature is named after the protected site of Vola in Western Balkan Mountains.

Location

Maps
 British Antarctic Territory. Scale 1:200000 topographic map. DOS 610 – W 69 70. Tolworth, UK, 1971
 Antarctic Digital Database (ADD). Scale 1:250000 topographic map of Antarctica. Scientific Committee on Antarctic Research (SCAR). Since 1993, regularly upgraded and updated

Notes

References
 Bulgarian Antarctic Gazetteer. Antarctic Place-names Commission. (details in Bulgarian, basic data in English)
 Vola Ridge. SCAR Composite Gazetteer of Antarctica

External links
 Vola Ridge. Copernix satellite image

Ridges of Alexander Island
Bulgaria and the Antarctic